The 1997 Star World Championships were held in Marblehead, United States between September 3 and 14, 1997.

Results

References

Star World Championships
1997 in sailing
Star World Championships in the United States
1997 in American sports